Pellagia Mujaji (born 9 October 1991) is a Zimbabwean cricketer. She played for the Zimbabwe women's national cricket team in the 2017 Women's Cricket World Cup Qualifier in February 2017. In February 2021, she was named in Zimbabwe's squad for their home series against Pakistan.

In September 2021, she was named in Zimbabwe's Women's Twenty20 International (WT20I) squad for the 2021 ICC Women's T20 World Cup Africa Qualifier tournament in Botswana. She made her WT20I debut on 17 September 2021, for Zimbabwe against Uganda.

In October 2021, Mujaji was named in Zimbabwe's Women's One Day International (WODI) squad for their four-match series against Ireland. The fixtures were the first WODI matches after Zimbabwe gained WODI status from the ICC in April 2021. She made her WODI debut on 5 October 2021, for Zimbabwe against Ireland.

References

External links
 

1991 births
Living people
Zimbabwean women cricketers
Zimbabwe women One Day International cricketers
Zimbabwe women Twenty20 International cricketers
Cricketers from Mutare
Mountaineers women cricketers